Hazar Ergüçlü (born 1 January 1992) is a Turkish-Cypriot actress. She is best known for playing Simay Canay in the drama series Kuzey Güney (2011–2013) and Eylül on the Turkish drama series Medcezir (2013–2015).

Early life
Ergüçlü was born in the northern part of Nicosia, Cyprus. Her mother works for a TV channel and her father works for a newspaper. She graduated from the theatre department of Haliç University.

Career
She has starred in a number of films, including Gölgeler ve Suretler, Açlığa Doymak, Benim Dünyam, Balık, Dar Elbise, Mahalle, Kar, Manyak, Ahlat Ağacı, and Herşey Seninle Güzel. She is a Siyad Award and Adana Film Festival Award winner. To go along with her extensive cinema career, she has had leading roles in a number of TV series, including Rüya Gibi, Kuzey Güney, Medcezir, Analar ve Anneler, Yüksek Sosyete, Hayat Sırları, and Dudullu Postası.

Filmography

Film

Television

References

External links 
 

1992 births
Living people
Turkish Cypriot actors
21st-century Cypriot actresses
People from North Nicosia
Cypriot film actresses
Cypriot television actresses
Turkish television actresses
Turkish film actresses